Winlock is a city in Lewis County, Washington, United States. The population was 1,472 at the 2020 census. It was named after territorial army general, Winlock M. Miller, who briefly resided there. Winlock is mostly famous for having the World's Largest Egg, reflecting its former status as a major producer of eggs. Early in its history, Winlock attracted many immigrants from Finland, Germany, and Sweden.

History

Origin
Winlock began as a Northern Pacific Railroad construction camp called Wheeler's Camp in c. 1871. The railroad was then in the process of extending its line from Kalama to Tacoma, Washington. Dr. C. C. Pagett, an early resident, donated the land for the townsite. In 1873, he named it for General William Winlock Miller of Olympia, a man of some renown in the area. Miller had promised to give a school bell to the town if it were to be named after him. The town was incorporated in 1883.

Early economy 
Lumbering was the initial economic driver. A number of sawmills were established beginning in the late 1800s. In the late 1920s there were four mills in operation, employing 350 men and producing over 30 million board feet of fir lumber annually.

Agriculture developed in the early 1900s with the impetus on the raising of poultry and the production of eggs. A branch of the Washington Cooperative Egg & Poultry Association located in the town constructed a large building in the north end of town, near the railroad tracks, around 1920. It housed grain storage bins and poultry processing facilities. The building remains standing today. Several hatcheries were located in the town. More than 750,000 baby chicks were produced during the 1928 season.

In 1922 it was noted in a local newspaper that the only American city that produced more eggs than Winlock was Petaluma, California. In a single weekend in 1923, Winlock shipped 38,400 dozen eggs to New York state. Winlock at that time was touted as the "Egg and Poultry Capital of the World".

Geography

Olequa Creek, a main tributary of the Cowlitz River, runs through the center of town from north to south.

The eastern edge of the Willapa Hills lie to the west. To the east are relatively flat prairies. A notable landmark about four miles west of town is Sam Henry Mountain, elevation , named for an early section superintendent of the Northern Pacific Railroad.

Demographics

2010 census
As of the census of 2010, there were 1,339 people, 475 households, and 327 families residing in the city. The racial makeup of the city was 84.7% White, 0.7% African American, 1.6% Native American, 0.6% Asian, 0.3% Pacific Islander, 8.4% from other races, and 3.8% from two or more races. Hispanic or Latino of any race were 13.1% of the population.

There were 475 households, of which 38.9% had children under the age of 18 living with them, 46.5% were married couples living together, 13.5% had a female householder with no husband present, 8.8% had a male householder with no wife present, and 31.2% were non-families. 24.6% of all households were made up of individuals, and 9.9% had someone living alone who was 65 years of age or older. The average household size was 2.79 and the average family size was 3.26.

The median age in the city was 34 years. 30.2% of residents were under the age of 18; 7.6% were between the ages of 18 and 24; 26.2% were from 25 to 44; 23.9% were from 45 to 64; and 12.1% were 65 years of age or older. The gender makeup of the city was 51.2% male and 48.8% female.

2000 census
As of the census of 2000, there were 1,166 people, 420 households, and 286 families residing in the city. The population density was 1,073.6 people per square mile (413.0/km2). There were 462 housing units at an average density of 425.4 per square mile (163.7/km2). The racial makeup of the city was 88.25% White, 0.17% African American, 0.77% Native American, 0.77% Asian, 6.17% from other races, and 3.86% from two or more races. Hispanic or Latino of any race were 8.58% of the population. 22.1% were of German, 18.4% English, 12.2% American and 7.3% Irish ancestry.

There were 420 households, out of which 35.7% had children under the age of 18 living with them, 53.3% were married couples living together, 10.0% had a female householder with no husband present, and 31.7% were non-families. 26.2% of all households were made up of individuals, and 14.3% had someone living alone who was 65 years of age or older. The average household size was 2.78 and the average family size was 3.38.

In the city, the population was spread out, with 31.9% under the age of 18, 8.0% from 18 to 24, 26.5% from 25 to 44, 21.1% from 45 to 64, and 12.5% who were 65 years of age or older. The median age was 33 years. For every 100 females, there were 95.3 males. For every 100 females age 18 and over, there were 90.9 males.

The median income for a household in the city was $30,000, and the median income for a family was $38,875. Males had a median income of $31,667 versus $20,547 for females. The per capita income for the city was $13,269. About 13.4% of families and 19.0% of the population were below the poverty line, including 30.4% of those under age 18 and 16.7% of those age 65 or over.

Arts and culture
Since 2000, the city has hosted an annual Winlock Pickersfest (formerly known as the Winlock Bluesgrass Festival) at Winolequa Park. The festival focuses on the use of stringed instruments, particularly the banjo, and are incorporated into various musical genres including Americana, bluegrass, and jazz. The three-day event is usually held on the first weekend of August.

Winlock Egg

The Winlock Egg was listed as the world's largest egg by Ripley's Believe It or Not! in 1989. The current structure is the fourth reincarnation of the original egg.

The first egg was built for a celebration of the opening of the Pacific Highway Bridge over the Columbia River between Washington and Oregon. The idea of an egg came from John G. Lawrence, the manager of the newly formed egg and poultry co-op as a way to represent the growing industry centered in Winlock in the 1920s. During that time farmers in Winlock were shipping as much as a quarter million cases of eggs to market a year.

The first egg was made of an egg shaped wood frame stretched with canvas and painted white. It was mounted onto a truck as part of a parade of floats and vehicles that traveled from Olympia, Washington to Salem, Oregon on October 23, 1923, to celebrate the expansion of trade between Washington and Oregon through the railroad. After the parade, the egg was placed on a platform near the train depot, and has since remained a source of local pride.

The first egg was covered with plaster but after 20 years in the elements the egg had deteriorated and was replaced by a plastic version made by a new company to the area, the Johnny Simpson's Plastic Company. This version also lasted about 20 years when it fell from its platform and cracked. A fiberglass replacement was made that some people thought looked more like a football than an egg. Then in 1991, a new replacement egg was part of the Egg Day Parade before it was placed in the Vern Zander Memorial Park. After the 9/11 attacks on the world trade center the egg was painted as a red, white, and blue American flag. In 2014, the Seattle Seahawks logo was painted on the egg after they won the Super Bowl.

Parks and recreation
The city is home to Winolequa Park, Winlock's only public park. Also known as Winolequa Memorial Park, it began by community volunteer effort in the 1960s and 1970s.

Government and politics

Politics
Winlock is recognized as being majority Republican and conservative.

The results for the 2020 U.S. Presidential Election for the Winlock voting district were as follows:

 Donald J. Trump (Republican) - 394 (61.28%)
 Joe Biden (Democrat) - 223 (34.68%)
 Jo Jorgensen (Libertarian) - 11 (1.71%)
 Other candidates - 9 (1.40%)
 Write-in candidate - 6 (0.93%)

Infrastructure
Washington State Route 505 begins in Winlock and runs east to Interstate 5 and beyond to the town of Toledo.  Highway 603, a former state route, continues north from Winlock to intersect with State Route 6 about 4 miles West of Chehalis.

The Burlington Northern railroad double track line runs through the middle of the town. Union Pacific and Amtrak trains also use these tracks. This line is the only rail connection between Seattle/Tacoma and Portland and supports heavy traffic. Freight service is available here but Amtrak does not stop, with the nearest station being in Centralia.

References

External links
 A History of Winlock, Washington
 History of Winlock and vicinity
 Winolequa Park

Cities in Washington (state)
Cities in Lewis County, Washington